Patrick Epaphra Ngowi is a Tanzanian entrepreneur, businessperson, environmentalist, Al Gore's climate change reality leader and United Nation's SDG 7 Pioneer. Patrick has founded and led several businesses over the course of his career.

Career 

Ngowi started his first business at age 15 when he started selling top-up vouchers for mobile phones in high school. After graduating, Ngowi travelled between China and Tanzania and brought back trendy and cheap phones, and began buying inexpensive phones from low-cost manufacturers and selling them in the Tanzanian market. He enrolled at Denzhou University in China, studying renewable energy.

Patrick Ngowi founded Helvetic Solar in 2007 to provide and install solar equipment in Tanzania and the United States. The company was awarded KPMG's No. 1 of the Top 100 Mid Sized Companies in Tanzania Award in 2012. The firm has since evolved into a diversified business group, of which he Chairs.

Recognition 
Forbes included Ngowi in its list of 30 under 30 Africa's Best Young Entrepreneurs and Forbes list of Young African Millionaires to Watch in 2013. He was again listed in the 2014 list of Africa's Most Promising Young Entrepreneurs through Helvetic Group. He was also named as East Africa's Young Business Leader of the Year 2014 by Forbes and CNBC. 

Ngowi has had multiple speaking roles at international events and in 2015 was elected as Chairman of the United Nations Global Compact in Tanzania.
A year later, it was announced by the United Nations Secretary General that Ngowi was one of the United Nation's Sustainable Development Goals (SGDs) Global 10 Pioneers, being a pioneer in providing access to clean energy, SDG 7.

Philanthropy
Ngowi is the founder of the Light for Life Foundation, a non-profit social enterprise of which focuses on providing free solar and small wind power systems for youth and women in rural and off-grid parts of Tanzania.

References

Living people
Tanzanian businesspeople
1985 births
People from Kilimanjaro Region